The SR-71 is a reconnaissance aircraft built by Lockheed.

SR-71 may also refer to:

 SR-71 (band), an American alternative rock band
 State Route 71, in the United States; See List of highways numbered 71
 Alabama State Route 71
 Arizona State Route 71
 California State Route 71
 Colorado State Highway 71
 Connecticut Route 71
 Delaware Route 71
 Florida State Road 71
 Georgia State Route 71
 Idaho State Highway 71
 Illinois Route 71
 Indiana State Road 71
 K-71 (Kansas highway); see List of Kansas numbered highways
 Maryland Route 71 (former)
 Massachusetts Route 71
 M-71 (Michigan highway)
 Missouri Route 71 (1922) (former)
 Nebraska Highway 71
 Nevada State Route 71 (former)
 New Jersey Route 71
 New York State Route 71
 North Carolina Highway 71
 Oklahoma State Highway 71
 Pennsylvania Route 71 (former)
 South Carolina Highway 71
 South Dakota Highway 71
 Tennessee State Route 71
 Texas State Highway 71
 Utah State Route 71
 Virginia State Route 71
 West Virginia Route 71
 Wisconsin Highway 71
 Wyoming Highway 71